This is a list of notable fashion designers sorted by nationality. It includes designers of haute couture and ready-to-wear.

For haute couture only, see the list of grands couturiers. For footwear designers, see the list of footwear designers.

Argentina

 Sofia Achaval de Montaigu
 Delia Cancela
 Alan Faena
 Franc Fernandez
 Gustavo Cadile
 Jazmín Chebar
 Paco Jamandreu
 Dalila Puzzovio
 Elsa Serrano
 Vanessa Seward
 Aitor Throup
 Pilar Zeta

Armenia

 Emin Bolbolian
 Kevork Shadoyan

Australia

 Prue Acton
 Peter Alexander
 Yeojin Bae
 Jenny Bannister
 Nadia Bartel
 Zara Bate
 Lucas Bowers
 Leigh Bowery
 Linda Britten
 Ray Brown
 Sarah-Jane Clarke
 Claudia Chan Shaw
 Flora Cheong-Leen
 Susien Chong
 Christopher Chronis
 Lorna Jane Clarkson
 Kay Cohen
 Wayne Cooper
 Keri Craig-Lee
 John Crittle
 Liz Davenport
 Rachel Dean
 Collette Dinnigan
 Leona Edmiston
 Pip Edwards
 Christopher Essex
 Enid Gilchrist
 Harlette De Falaise
 Nicola Finetti
 Camilla Freeman-Topper
 Frederick Fox
 Camilla Franks
 Joshua Goot
 Lisa Gorman
 Juli Grbac
 Melanie Greensmith
 Alannah Hill
 Elvie Hill
 Jessie Hill
 Lisa Ho
 Jennifer Hocking
 Akira Isogawa
 Linda Jackson
 Peter Jackson
 Beril Jents
 Rebecca Judd
 Storm Keating
 Jenny Kee
 Steven Khalil
 Dion Lee
 Bettina Liano
 Jacob Luppino
 Virginia Martin
 Alice McCall
 Toni Matičevski
 Dannii Minogue
 Peter Morrissey
 Ivy May Pearce
 Alex Perry
 Katie Perry
 Anthony Pittorino
 Neville Quist
 Tamara Ralph
 Joe Saba
 Bruno Schiavi
 Bob Schulz
 Sheila Scotter
 Dan Single
 Bianca Spender
 Paula Stafford
 Ruth Tarvydas
 Shona Joy Thatcher
 Sophia Tolli
 Richard Tyler
 Paul Vasileff
 Erica Wardle
 Johanna Weigel
 Bowie Wong
 Lisa Xu
 Carla Zampatti
 Aheda Zanetti
 Gary Zecevic

Austria

 Werner Baldessarini
 Sigmar Berg
 Eva Maria Düringer Cavalli
 Emilie Louise Flöge
 Gertrud Höchsmann
 Nina Hollein
 Emma Jacobsson
 Andreas Kronthaler
 Helmut Lang
 Michael Lanner
 Birgit C. Muller
 Moriz Piffl-Perčević
 Ruth Rogers-Altmann
 Jutta Sika

Bangladesh
 Maheen Khan
 Bibi Russell
 Asma Sultana

Barbados

 Rihanna

Belarus

 Apti Eziev
 Dmitry Sholokhov

Belgium

 Valentine Avoh
 Maggy Baum
 Dirk Bikkembergs
 Veronique Branquinho
 Christophe Coppens
 Tim Coppens
 Jules-François Crahay
 Angele Delanghe 
 Ann Demeulemeester
 Honorine Deschrijver
 Désirée zu Hohenlohe-Langenburg
 Cedric Jacquemyn
 Martin Margiela
 Bruno Pieters
 Cathy Pill
 Elvis Pompilio
 Ann Salens
 Raf Simons
 Olivier Strelli
 Olivier Theyskens
 Kaat Tilley
 Jeanne Toussaint
 Kris Van Assche
 Walter Van Beirendonck
 Dries van Noten
 Anthony Vaccarello
 Édouard Vermeulen

Belize

 Rebecca Stirm

Bolivia

 Vanessa Alfaro
 Beatriz Canedo Patiño
 Monica Moss
 Eliana Paco Paredes

Bosnia

 Adnan Hajrulahović (Haad)

Brazil

 Camila Alves
 Zuzu Angel
 Bruno Basso
 Alexandre Birman
 Georgina Brandolini d'Adda
 Barbara Casasola
 Igor Cavalera
 Francisco Costa
 Adriana Degreas
 Tufi Duek
 Alexandre Herchcovitch
 Clodovil Hernandes
 Lorenzo Merlino
 Alessandra Meskita
 Oskar Metsavaht
 Carlos Miele
 Inacio Ribeiro
 Amir Slama
 Iracema Trevisan
 Carlos Tufvesson
 Diego Vanassibara
 Ocimar Versolato

Bulgaria

 Myléna Atanassova
 Viliana Georgieva
 Kiko Kostadinov

Burma

 Ahlatt Lumyang
 Myo Minn Soe
 May Myat Waso
 Steven Oo
 Mogok Pauk Pauk

Burundi

 Cynthia Munwangari

Cambodia

 Eric Raisina

Cameroon

 Imane Ayissi
 Mireille Nemale

Canada

 Atuat Akkitirq
 Marcel B. Aucoin
 Susan Avingaq
 Lida Baday
 Brian Bailey
 Christopher Bates
 Tammy Beauvais
 Tishynah Buffalo
 Nicole Camphaug
 Dean and Dan Caten
 Simon Chang
 Dov Charney
 Edison Chen
 Ian H. Cooper
 Douglas Coupland
 Patrick Cox
 Mario Davignon
 MLMA
 Angela DeMontigny
 Steve Dubbeldam
 Ashley Ebner
 John Fluevog
 Sunny Fong
 Ariel Garten
 Dorothy Grant
 Elora Hardy
 Adrianne Ho
 Rad Hourani
 Bruno Ierullo
 Aurora James
 Tara Jarmon
 Victoria Kakuktinniq
 Lloyd Klein
 Jeremy Laing
 Avril Lavigne
 Edeline Lee
 Devon Halfnight LeFlufy
 Dan Liu
 Charles Lu
 Linda Lundström
 Margeaux
 Liam Massaubi
 Pat McDonagh
 Joe Mimran
 Paul Minichiello
 Erdem Moralıoğlu
 Melaw Nakehk'o
 Mina Napartuk
 Sid Neigum
 Marie-Paule Nolin
 Aaju Peter
 Ruth Qaulluaryuk
 Richard Robinson
 Arnold Scaasi
 Céline Semaan Vernon
 Bojana Sentaler
 Kim Smiley
 George Sully
 Alfred Sung
 Luke Tanabe
 Tanya Taylor
 Collin Thompson
 Marion Tuu'luq
 Malorie Urbanovitch
 Liz Vandal
 Rita Vinieris
 Shannon Wilson
 Adrienne Wu
 Jason Wu

Chad

 Benjamin Kirchhoff

Chile

 Maria Cornejo

China

 Edison Chen
 Movana Chen
 Betty Clemo
 Guo Pei
 Kenny Ho
 Vivienne Hu
 Ma Ke
 Titi Kwan
 Eddie Lau
 Henry Lau
 Chris Liu
 Lü Yan
 Masha Ma
 Kevin Poon
 Vivienne Poy
 John Rocha
 Vivienne Tam
 William Tang
 Oscar Udeshi
 Momo Wang
 Taoray Wang
 Yu Feng
 Lan Yu
 Nellie Yu Roung Ling

Colombia

 Esteban Cortázar
 Silvia Tcherassi

Croatia

 Boris Banović
 Damir Doma
 Žuži Jelinek
 Olja Luetić
 Mandali Mendrilla

Cuba

 Fabiola Arias
Lisandra Ramos
 Isabel Toledo

Cyprus
 Mustafa Aslanturk
 Hussein Chalayan
 Nicolas Petrou

Czech Republic

 Zika Ascher
 Sidonie Grünwald-Zerkowitz
 Zuzana Králová
 Betty Yokova

Denmark

 Malene Birger
 Louise Lyngh Bjerregaard
 Lilly Brændgaard
 Erik Brandt
 Margit Brandt
 Helena Christensen
 Charlotte Eskildsen
 Julie Fagerholt
 Grethe Glad
 Barbara í Gongini
 Liffa Gregoriussen
 Bente Hammer
 Lars Hillingsø
 Peter Ingwersen
 Peter Jensen
 Anne Sofie Madsen
 Bitte Kai Rand
 Louise Sandberg
 Aage Thaarup
 Henrik Vibskov
 Ole Yde

Dominican Republic

 Sully Bonnelly
 Monica Boyar
 José Durán
 Hernan Lander
 Jenny Polanco
 Jackie Sencion
 Manuel Tarrazo
 Oscar de la Renta

Ecuador

 Roberto de Villacis

El Salvador

 Francesca Miranda

Estonia

 Diana Arno
Roberta Einer

Ethiopia

 Amsale Aberra
 Fikirte Addis
 Mahlet Afework

Finland

 Antti Asplund
 Sandra Hagelstam
 Katriina Haikala
 Riitta Immonen
 Maija Isola
 Samu-Jussi Koski
 Teuvo Loman
 Vilma Metter
 Vuokko Nurmesniemi
 Mert Otsamo
 Sveta Planman
 Saara

France

A-G

 Haider Ackermann
 Gaby Aghion
 Madame Agnès
 Sophie Albou
 Gérard Albouy
 Mademoiselle Alexandre
 Joseph Altuzarra
 Jérémy Amelin
 Adeline André
 Christian Audigier
 Augustabernard (Augusta Bernard)
 Dominique Aurientis
 Loris Azzaro
 agnès b.
 Vitaldi & Maurice Babani
 Pierre Balmain
 Jean Barthet
 Anne Marie Beretta
 Le Sieur Beaulard
 Rose Bertin
 Marc Bohan
 Vera Borea
 Coco Brandolini d'Adda
 Vanessa Bruno
 Marie-Louise Bruyère
 Herminie Cadolle
 Serge Cajfinger
 Callot Soeurs
 Émile Camuset
 Pierre Cardin
 Marie-Louise Carven
 Yves Castaldi
 Jean-Charles de Castelbajac
 Louis-Marie de Castelbajac
 Coco Chanel
 Christofle Charvet
 Marcelle Chaumont
 Louise Chéruit
 Robert Clergerie
 Marie-Françoise Corot
 André Courrèges
 Jeanne Damas
 Christophe Decarnin
 Zahia Dehar
 Jean Dessès
 Kostio de War
 Rehane Yavar Dhala
 Mohamed Dia
 Christian Dior
 Georges Doeuillet
 Marcelle Dormoy
 Jacques Doucet
 Marie Madeleine Duchapt 
 Pierre-Alexis Dumas
 Madame Eloffe
 Benoît-Pierre Emery
 Nicole Farhi
 Jacques Fath
 Louis Féraud
 Anne Fontaine
 Julien Fournié
 Inès de La Fressange
 Maud Frizon
 Jean Paul Gaultier
 Katell Gélébart
 Nicolas Ghesquière
 Hubert de Givenchy
 Michel Goma
 Madame Grès
 Jacques Griffe
 Jacques Guarrigue-Lefèvre

H-N

 Sophie Habsburg
 Pierre Hardy
 Anne Valérie Hash
 Daniel Hechter
 Jacques Heim
 Madame Herbault
 Simon Porte Jacquemus
 Bouchra Jarrar
 Christophe Josse
 Charles Jourdan
 Philip Karto
 Emmanuelle Khanh
 Michel Klein
 Romain Kremer
 Bernard Lacoste
 René Lacoste
 Christian Lacroix
 Madeleine Laferrière
 Frédéric Luca Landi
 Jeanne Lanvin
 Ted Lapidus
 Guy Laroche
 Alexis Lavigne
 Françoise Leclerc
 Didier Lecoanet
 Germaine Lecomte
 Lucien Lelong
 Lolita Lempicka
 Hervé Leroux
 Louis Hippolyte Leroy
 Julie de Libran
 Christian Louboutin
 Serge Lutens
 Alexis Mabille
 Catherine Malandrino
 Alain Manoukian
 Isabel Marant
 Léo Marciano
 Maripol
 Natacha Marro
 Paul Mausner
 Frank Mechaly
 Sophie Mechaly
 Rodolphe Menudier
 Sébastien Meunier
 Simone Mirman
 Caroline Montagne Roux
 Claude Montana
 Gilles Montezin
 Roland Mouret
 Thierry Mugler
 Henriette Negrin

O-Z

 Andre Oliver
 Mademoiselle Pagelle
 Madame Palmyre
 Jeanne Paquin
 Jean Patou
 Mr Pearl
 Lucien Pellat-Finet
 André Perugia
 Phoebe Philo
 Christine Phung
 Paloma Picasso
 Hervé Pierre
 Robert Piguet
 Octavio Pizarro
 Paul Poiret
 Lola Prusac
 Louis Réard
 Caroline Reboux
 Jane Régny
 Cécile Reinaud
 Rose Repetto
 Julia Restoin Roitfeld
 Jacqueline de Ribes
 Nina Ricci
 Marcel Rochas
 Stéphane Rolland
 Michèle Rosier
 Maggy Rouff
 Olivier Rousteing
 Francois Russo
 Sonia Rykiel
 Jenny Sacerdote
 Hemant Sagar
 Claude Saint-Cyr
 Hélène de Saint Lager
 Yves Saint Laurent
 Jean-Louis Scherrer
 Marine Serre
 Maxime Simoëns
 Dominique Sirop
 Martine Sitbon
 Hedi Slimane
 Ginette Spanier
 Franck Sorbier
 Sophie Theallet
 Éric Tibusch
 Dina Tiktiner Viterbo
 Dominic Toubeix
 Ramdane Touhami
 Emanuel Ungaro
 Nadège Vanhee-Cybulski
 Alexandre Vauthier
 Philippe Venet
 Virginie Viard
 Madame Victorine
 Madame Vignon
 Madeleine Vionnet
 Madame Virot
 Roger Vivier
 Louis Vuitton
 Yiqing Yin

Georgia

 Ekaterine Abuladze
 Anouki Areshidze
 Avtandil
 Bessarion
 Lako Bukia
 Keti Chkhikvadze
 Teona Gardapkhadze
 Demna Gvasalia
 Ria Keburia
 David Koma
 Keto Mikeladze
 Aka Nanitashvili
 Irakli Nasidze
 Tatuna Nikolaishvili
 Irina Shabayeva
 Tamar and Natasha Surguladze

Germany

 Torsten Amft
 Iris von Arnim
 Barbara Becker
 Gunda Beeg
 Anna Ben-Yusuf
 Maria Bogner
 Willy Bogner, Sr.
 Willy Bogner, Jr.
 Hugo Boss
 Gregor Clemens
 Adolf Dassler
 Rudolf Dassler
 Barbara Engel
 Susanne Erichsen
 Robert Geller
 Harald Glööckler
 Anja Gockel
 Eva Gronbach
 Otto Ludwig Haas-Heye
 Uli Herzner
 Mafalda von Hessen
 Claudia Hill
 Wolfgang Joop
 Heidi Klum
 Guido Maria Kretschmer
 Karl Lagerfeld
 Frank Leder
 Rolf Leeser
 Sonja de Lennart
 Margaretha Ley
 Markus Lupfer
 Georg Lux
 Tomas Maier
 Maria May
 Michael Michalsky
 Rudolph Moshammer
 Anna Muthesius
 Heinz Oestergaard
 Leyla Piedayesh
 Philipp Plein
 Christian Roth
 Boris Bidjan Saberi
 Jil Sander
 Claudia Schiffer
 Wiebke Siem
 Alex Stenzel
 Stefan Szczesny
 Gerhard Weber
 Bernhard Willhelm
 Tilmann Wröbel
 Noah Wunsch

Ghana

 Joyce Ababio
 Tetteh Adzedu
 Kofi Ansah
 Aisha Ayensu
 Kwaku Bediako
 Ophelia Crossland
 Kofi Okyere Darko
 Kabutey and Sumaiya Dzietror
 Samata Pattinson
 Mabel Simpson
 Abena Takyiwa
 Maame Esi Acquah Taylor
 Sally Torpey
 Nana Kwasi Wiafe

Greece

 Christos Costarellos
 Kiki Divaris
 Yiannis Evangelides
 Celia Kritharioti
 Eleni Kyriacou
 Panos Papadopoulos
 Sakis Rouvas
 Yiannis Tseklenis
 Sotirios Voulgaris

Haiti

 Regine Chevallier
 Azéde Jean-Pierre

Hungary

 Etienne Aigner
 Zoltán Herczeg
 Mariska Karasz
 Emeric Partos
 Katalin zu Windisch-Graetz

Iceland

 Guðmundur Jörundsson
 Sruli Recht
 Steinunn Sigurðardóttir

India

A-L

 Anaita Shroff Adajania
 Erum Ali
 Muzaffar Ali
 Manish Arora
 Bhanu Athaiya
 Varija Bajaj
 Rohit Bal
 Nachiket Barve
 Maxima Basu
 Ritu Beri
 Sangeeta Boochra
 Aparna Chandra
 Troy Costa
 Joy Crizildaa
 Lalit Dalmia
 Ruma Devi
 Rina Dhaka
 Rehane Yavar Dhala
 Anita Dongre
 James Ferreira
 Prasantt Ghosh
 Surily Goel
 Masaba Gupta
 Omi Gurung
 Asma Hussain
 Poornima Indrajith
 Indrans
 Dolly Jain
 Madhu Jain
 Payal Jain
 Anand Jon
 Beena Kannan
 Alvira Khan Agnihotri
 Gauri Khan
 Naeem Khan
 Sussanne Khan
 Anamika Khanna
 Radhika Khanna
 Manoviraj Khosla
 Rohit Khosla
 Sandeep Khosla
 Archana Kochhar
 Ritu Kumar
 Neeta Lulla

M-Z

 Nandita Mahtani
 Manish Malhotra
 Asmita Marwa
 Shantanu and Nikhil Mehra
 Rahul Mishra
 Ayushman Mitra
 Anju Modi
 Bibhu Mohapatra
 Lucky Morani
 Sabyasachi Mukherjee
 Robert Naorem
 Aki Narula
 Shaina NC
 Deepali Noor
 Ruchika Pandey
 Agnimitra Paul
 Vikram Phadnis
 Pernia Qureshi
 Malvika Raj
 Amritha Ram
 Poornima Ramaswamy
 Raghavendra Rathore
 Rocky Star
 Wendell Rodricks
 S.B. Satheeshan
 Anjana Seth
 Esha Sethi Thirani
 Kalpana Shah
 Komal Shahani
 Jishad Shamsudeen
 Barkha Sharma
 Sheetal Sharma
 Suvigya Sharma
 Reza Shariffi 
 Mana Shetty
 Anaita Shroff Adajania
 Satish Sikha
 Anna Singh
 Govind Kumar Singh
 Leena Singh 
 Rajesh Pratap Singh
 Sameera Saneesh
 Sonakshi Sinha
 Sidney Sladen
 Nalini Sriram
 Tarun Tahiliani
 Sakhi Thomas
 JJ Valaya
 Anu Vardhan
 Suneet Varma
 Varsha Wadhwa
 Maral Yazarloo
 Nidhi Yasha

Indonesia

 Anne Avantie
 Asha Smara Darra
 Ardistia Dwiasri
 Sebastian Gunawan
 Peggy Hartanto
 Anniesa Hasibuan
 Didit Hediprasetyo
 Oscar Lawalata
 Yovita Meta
 Obin (Josephine Komara)
 Susanna Perini
 Tex Saverio
 Vicky Shu
 Auguste Soesastro
 Heaven Tanudiredja
 Iwan Tirta
 Biyan Wanaatmadja

Iran

 Farnaz Abdoli
 Ray Aghayan
 Haman Alimardani
 Pegah Anvarian
 Bijan (Bijan Pakzad)
 Cleopatra Birrenbach
 Paria Farzaneh
 Mimi Fayazi
 Shirin Guild
 Keyvan Khosrovani
 Arefeh Mansouri
 Sareh Nouri
 Zahra Yarahmadi
 Maral Yazarloo
 Mahla Zamani

Iraq

 Reem Alasadi
 Hana Sadiq
 Tamara Salman
 Salim al-Shimiri
 Zeena Zaki

Ireland

 Sinéad Burke
 John Cavanagh
 Pauline Clotworthy
 Sybil Connolly
 Paul Costelloe
 Pat Crowley
 Michael Donnellan
 Irene Gilbert
 Daphne Guinness
 Daniel Kearns
 Louise Kennedy
 Lainey Keogh
 Daryl Kerrigan
 Orla Kiely
 Richard Malone
 Miriam Mone
 Digby Morton
 Neillí Mulcahy
 Don O'Neill
 Jacqueline Quinn
 Simone Rocha
 Ciaran Sweeney
 Pauric Sweeney
 Philip Treacy
 Sharon Wauchob

Israel

 Yigal Azrouël
 Berta Balliti
 Maya Bash
 Lola Beer Ebner
 Rinat Brodach
 Ronen Chen
 Inbal Dror
 Adi Gil
 Lea Gottlieb
 Ronen Jehezkel
 Hila Klein
 Galia Lahav
 Alon Livne
 Nili Lotan
 Danit Peleg
 Noa Raviv
 Yotam Solomon
 Elie Tahari
 Pnina Tornai
 Ruti Zisser

Italy

A-E

 Loris Abate
 Edina Altara
 Maria Antonelli
 Giorgio Armani
 Renato Balestra
 Rocco Barocco
 Sara Battaglia
 Laura Biagiotti
 Marzia Bisognin
 Elvira Leonardi Bouyeure
 Giuliana Camerino
 Rene Caovilla
 Ennio Capasa
 Roberto Capucci
 Domenico Caraceni
 Consuelo Castiglioni
 Orsola de Castro
 Roberto Cavalli
 Emilio Cavallini
 Nino Cerruti
 Marco Coretti
 Corneliani
 Ugo Correani
 Enrico Coveri
 Lydia de Crescenzo
 Brunello Cucinelli
 Antonio D'Amico
 Alessandro Dell'Acqua
 Mariano Di Vaio
 Domenico Dolce
 José Eisenberg

F-M

 Alessandra Facchinetti
 Anna Fendi
 Ilaria Venturini Fendi
 James Ferragamo
 Salvatore Ferragamo
 Wanda Ferragamo
 Gianfranco Ferré
 Alberta Ferretti
 Marta Ferri
 Elio Fiorucci
 Giovanna Fontana
 Graziella Fontana
 Micol Fontana
 Zoe Fontana
 Nicola Formichetti
 Mariano Fortuny
 Virginia von Fürstenberg
 Stefano Gabbana
 Irene Galitzine
 Maria Monaci Gallenga
 Fernanda Gattinoni
 Rosa Genoni
 Giancarlo Giammetti
 Frida Giannini
 Romeo Gigli
 Massimiliano Giornetti
 Gisella Giovenco
 Adriano Goldschmied
 Maria Grazia Chiuri
 Olga di Grésy
 Aldo Gucci
 Guccio Gucci
 Paolo Gucci
 Domitilla Harding
 Rossella Jardini
 Stella Jean
 Max Kibardin
 Marzia Kjellberg
 Agostino Lanfranchi
 André Laug
 Angelo Litrico
 Gianfranco Lotti
 Bruno Magli
 Mariuccia Mandelli
 Achille Maramotti
 Valeria Marini
 Alviero Martini
 Germana Marucelli
 Roberto Faraone Mennella
 Alessandro Michele
 Angela Missoni
 Margherita Missoni
 Ottavio Missoni
 Anna Molinari
 Franco Moschino

N-Z

 Massimo Osti
 Cesare Paciotti
 Pietro Loro Piana
 Pierpaolo Piccioli
 Stefano Pilati
 Mario Prada
 Miuccia Prada
 Alby Sabrina Pretto
 Emilio Pucci
 Rose Repetto
 Eva Rorandelli
 Sergio Rossi
 Renzo Rosso
 Francesco Rulli
 Fausto Sarli
 Alessandro Sartori
 Andrea Sassetti
 Elsa Schiaparelli
 Mila Schön
 Emilio Schuberth
 Francesco Smalto
 Luciano Soprani
 Simonetta Stefanelli
 Sergio Tacchini
 Jamal Taslaq
 Thayaht
 Anne Tirocchi
 Laura Tirocchi
 Riccardo Tisci
 Nicola Trussardi
 Valentino
 Giambattista Valli
 Jole Veneziani
 Giancarlo Venturini
 Donatella Versace
 Gianni Versace
 Lucila Mara de Vescovi Whitman
 Fabrizio Viti
 Marco Zanini
 Giuseppe Zanotti
 Ermenegildo Zegna
 Italo Zucchelli

Ivory Coast

 O'Plérou Grebet
 Loza Maléombho

Japan

 Sara Arai
 Jun Ashida
 Tae Ashida
 Chiaki
 Tsumori Chisato
 Tsuyoshi Domoto
 Limi Feu
 Hiroshi Fujiwara
 Sayo Hayakawa
 Nobuki Hizume
 Eiko Ishioka
 Masato Jones
 Uno Kanda
 Rei Kawakubo
 Kenzō
 Takeo Kikuchi
 Wakako Kishimoto
 Kiyoharu
 Mako Kojima
 Satoshi Kondo
 Yoshiyuki Konishi
 Michiko Koshino
 Mana
 Eri Matsui
 Meg
 Akina Minami
 Issey Miyake
 Sarah Miyazawa LaFleur
 Hanae Mori
 Tomoaki Nagao
 Kiyoharu Mori
 Tayuka Nakanishi
 Hirooko Naoto
 Nigo
 Jotaro Saito
 Mariko Shinoda
 Tadashi Shoji
 Daiki Suzuki
 Jun Takahashi
 Toshinosuke Takegahara
 Novala Takemoto
 Akira Takeuchi
 Junya Tashiro
 Noritaka Tatehana
 Kosuke Tsumura
 Charles Tsunashima
 Aya Ueto
 Chinatsu Wakatsuki
 Junya Watanabe
 Naomi Watanabe
 Sayoko Yamaguchi
 Kansai Yamamoto
 Yohji Yamamoto
 Yoshiki
 Sugino Yoshiko
 Junko Yoshioka

Kosovo
 Dejzi
 Lirika Matoshi
 Teuta Matoshi

Kuwait

 Ascia AKF
 Nejoud Boodai

Latvia

 Gints Bude
 Olga Peterson
 Katya Shehurina

Lebanon

 Reem Acra
 Huguette Caland
 Georges Chakra
 Sonia Fares
 Nour Hage
 Georges Hobeika
 Nicolas Jebran
 Rabih Kayrouz
 Abed Mahfouz
 Sandra Mansour
 Zuhair Murad
 Robert Abi Nader
 Elie Saab
 Nemer Saade
 Gaby Saliba
 Basil Soda
 Tony Ward

Lithuania

 Lena Himmelstein
 Stanislovas Jančiukas
 Zita Kreivytė

Malawi

 Lily Alfonso
 Lillian Koreia
 Vanessa Nsona

Malaysia

 Shila Amzah
 Bernard Chandran
 Jimmy Choo
 Farah Khan
 Rena Koh
 Beatrice Looi
 Melinda Looi
 Richard Rivalee
 Rupert Sanderson
 Edmund Ser
 Nor Aini Shariff
 Zang Toi

Mali

 Malamine Koné
 Lamine Badian Kouyaté
 Chris Seydou

Mauritius

 Yuvna Kim

Mexico

 Christian Cota
 Ricardo Covalin
 Manuel Cuevas
 Carla Fernández
 Dolores Gonzales
 Paola Hernandez
 Eduardo Lucero
 Raul Melgoza
 Mario Moya
 Luz Pavon
 Cristina Pineda
 John Saldivar
 Bárbara Sánchez-Kane
 Michelle Torres
 José María Torre
 Ximena Valero

Morocco

 Alber Elbaz
 Joseph Ettedgui
 Paul Marciano

Nepal

 Shail Upadhya
 Prabal Gurung

Netherlands

 Sharon den Adel
 Koos Van Den Akker
 Laila Aziz
 Martyn Bal
 Wilbert Das
 Marlies Dekkers
 Dominique van Dijk
 Sergio van Dijk
 Pauline van Dongen
 Catta Donkersloot
 Lidewij Edelkoort
 Kurt Elshot
 Camiel Fortgens
 Olcay Gulsen
 Michael van der Ham
 Monique van Heist
 Iris van Herpen
 Nick van Hofwegen
 Viktor Horsting
 Percy Irausquin
 Ronald van der Kemp
 Marijke Koger
 Bas Kosters
 Addy van den Krommenacker
 Christian Lagerwaard
 Josje Leeger
 Fong Leng
 Frans Molenaar
 Annelies Nuy
 Marvin Oduber
 Sanae Orchi
 Simon Posthuma
 Alexander van Slobbe
 Rolf Snoeren
 Jan Taminiau
 Josephus Thimister
 Marly van der Velden
 Babette Venderbos
 Mart Visser
 Edgar Vos
 Sascha Warmenhoven
 Sven Westendorp
 Angelique Westerhof

New Zealand

 Margo Barton
 Annie Bonza
 Fanny Buss
 Trelise Cooper
 Kristine Crabb
 Liz Findlay
 Judy Gao
 Trish Gregory
 Malcolm Harrison
 Anouska Hempel
 Susan Holmes
 Kerrie Hughes
 Emma Knuckey
 Denise L'Estrange-Corbet
 Candy Lane
 Lindah Lepou
 Vinka Lucas
 Flora MacKenzie
 Konstantina Moutos
 Bruce Papas
 Doris de Pont
 Sally Ridge
 Margi Robertson
 Kate Sylvester
 Joan Talbot
 Rebecca Taylor
 Karen Walker
 Emilia Wickstead

Niger

 Alphadi (Seidnally Sidhamed)

Nigeria

 Omoyemi Akerele
 Folorunsho Alakija
 Asi Archibong-Arikpo
 Mai Atafo
 Ituen Basi
 Folake Coker
 Lanre da Silva
 Maryam Elisha
 Lisa Folawiyo
 Reni Folawiyo
 Yeni Kuti
 Muma Gee
 Dumebi Iyamah
 Adejoke Lasisi
 Ugo Mozie
 Clement Mudiaga Enajemo
 Isoken Ogiemwonyi
 Mowalola Ogunlesi
 Og Okonkwo
 Duro Olowu
 Amaka Osakwe
 Yemi Osunkoya
 Deola Sagoe
 Sasha P
 Sexy Steel
 Ejiro Amos Tafiri
 Shade Thomas-Fahm
 Patience Torlowei
 Wavy the Creator

North Macedonia

 Risto Bimbiloski
 Nikola Eftimov
 Marjan Pejoski

Norway

 Kristian Aadnevik
 Anne Helene Gjelstad
 Fam Irvoll
 William Duborgh Jensen
 Andreas Melbostad
 Gunhild Nygaard
 Pontine Paus
 Julie Skarland
 Per Spook

Pakistan

 Vaneeza Ahmad
 Aijaz Aslam
 Mehmood Bhatti
 Zainab Chottani
 Sarah Gandapur
 Nadia Hussain
 Junaid Jamshed
 Maheen Khan
 Sadaf Malaterre
 Omar Mansoor
 Sania Maskatiya
 Deepak Perwani
 Kamiar Rokni
 Wardha Saleem
 Shamoon Sultan
 Hassan Sheheryar Yasin

Panama

 Federico Visuetti

Papua New Guinea

 Sarah Haoda Todd

Peru

 Mocha Graña
 Alessandra de Osma

Philippines

 Michael Cinco
 Ito Curata
 Mich Dulce
 Christian Espiritu
 Ben Farrales
 Jasper Garvida
 Sassa Jimenez
 Monique Lhuillier
 Imelda Marcos
 Lesley Mobo
 Pitoy Moreno
 Puey Quiñones
 Andre Soriano
 Rosenthal Tee
 Kermit Tesoro
 Mak Tumang
 Ramón Valera

Poland

 Roma Gąsiorowska
 Joanna Horodyńska
 Barbara Hulanicki
 Monika Jaruzelska
 Michael Maximilian
 Ewa Minge
 Anna Potok
 Henri Strzelecki
 Dawid Tomaszewski
 Dawid Woliński
 Xymena Zaniewska-Chwedczuk
 Maciej Zien
 Karolina Zmarlak

Portugal

 Paulo Almeida
 Felipe Oliveira Baptista
 Luís Buchinho
 Fátima Lopes
 Marta Marques
 Isilda Pelicano
 Ricardo Preto

Puerto Rico

 Carlota Alfaro
 Franco Lacosta
 Nono Maldonado
 Lisa Thon

Romania

 Ioana Ciolacu
 Amina Muaddi
 Dorin Negrau
 Narcisa Pheres
 Irina Schrotter
 Joseph Seroussi
 Ben Zuckerman

Russia

 Aslan Ahmadov
 Olga Bulbenkova
 Erté
 Angela Donhauser
 Oxana Fedorova
 Irina Fedotova
 Sultanna Frantsuzova
 Natalia Goncharova
 Irina Khakamada
 Nadezhda Lamanova
 Katya Lee
 Radmila Lolly
 Ekaterina Malysheva
 Leon Max
 Jana Nedzvetskaya
 Kira Plastinina
 Alexandre Plokhov
 Nicolas Putvinski
 Gosha Rubchinskiy
 Ulyana Sergeenko
 Denis Simachev
 Alexey Sorokin
 Natalia Valevskaya
 Helen Yarmak
 Valentin Yudashkin
 Vyacheslav Zaitsev
 Dasha Zhukova

Rwanda

 Sonia Mugabo

Saudi Arabia

 Adnan Akbar
 Yahya Al Bishri
 Amina Al Jassim

Senegal

 Papis Loveday
 Oumou Sy

Serbia

 Mihalo Anusic
 Jelena Behrend
 Melina Džinović
 Roksanda Ilincic
 Nevena Ivanović
 Ines Janković
 Sara Jovanović
 Sonja Jocić
 Nikolija Jovanović
 Jelena Karleuša
 Bernat Klein
 Darko Kostić
 Ana Kraš
 Aleksandra Lalić
 Ana Ljubinković
 Zvonko Marković
 Marijana Matthäus
 Evica Milovanov-Penezic
 Boris Nikolić
 Ivana Pilja
 Aleksandar Protić
 Ana Rajcevic
 Verica Rakocević
 Gorjana Reidel 
 Ana Šekularac
 Ivana Sert
 Bata Spasojević
 George Styler

Singapore

 Elim Chew
 Ashley Isham
 Hayden Ng
 Benny Ong
 Priscilla Shunmugam

Slovakia

 Lubica Kucerova

Somalia

 Iman

South Africa

 Errol Arendz
 Marc Bouwer
 Gert-Johan Coetzee
 Kara Janx
 Abigail Keats
 Thebe Magugu
 Nkhensani Manganyi Nkosi
 Enhle Mbali Mlotshwa
 Palesa Mokubung
 Mpura
 Simon Rademan
 Gavin Rajah
 David Rosen
 Albertus Swanepoel
 David Tlale
 Hendrik Vermeulen

South Korea

 André Kim
 Lie Sang-Bong
 MLMA
 Sang A Im-Propp
 Minju Kim
 Rejina Pyo
 Lea Seong
 Lee Young-hee
 Young-mi Woo

Spain

 Sita Abellán
 Miguel Adrover
 Estrella Archs
 Amaya Arzuaga
 Cristóbal Balenciaga
 Maria Barros
 Armand Basi
 Elena Benarroch
 Vicky Martín Berrocal
 Elio Berhanyer
 Manolo Blahnik
 Custo Dalmau
 Adolfo Domínguez
 Tiziana Domínguez
 Ana González
 Gala Gonzalez
 Pedro del Hierro
 Ana Locking
 Pura Lopez
 Rosalía Mera
 Manuel Mota
 Sita Murt
 Lluís Juste de Nin
 Elisa Palomino
 Manuel Pertegaz
 Jesús del Pozo
 Paco Rabanne
 Ágatha Ruiz de la Prada
 Andrés Sardá Sacristán
 Felipe Varela
 Domingo Zapata

Sri Lanka

 Nayana Karunaratne
 Ramzi Rahaman
 Ashcharya Peiris
 Ruchira Silva
 Anuradha Yahampath

Sweden

 Valerie Aflalo
 Erika Aittamaa
 Efva Attling
 Moki Cherry
 Amanda Christensen
 Malinda Damgaard
 Agneta Eckemyr
 Martis Karin Ersdotter
 Emy Fick
 Elisabeth Glantzberg
 Maja Gunn
 Yvette Hass
 Jenny Hellström
 Sighsten Herrgård
 Per Holknekt
 Ann-Sofie Johansson
 Jonny Johansson
 Katja of Sweden (Karin Hallberg)
 Filippa Knutsson
 Hanna Lindberg
 Johan Lindeberg
 Carolina Lindström
 Augusta Lundin
 Lars Nilsson
 Gunilla Pontén
 Rebecca Simonsson
 Gudrun Sjödén
 Bea Szenfeld
 Camilla Thulin
 Lars Wallin
 Lars-Åke Wilhelmsson

Switzerland

 Marianne Alvoni
 BillyBoy*
 Keren Craig
 Egon von Fürstenberg
 Gaby Jouval
 Albert Kriemler
 Stefi Talman

Syria

 Rami Al Ali
 Odette Barsa
 Nabil El-Nayal

Taiwan

 Malan Breton
 Wenlan Chia
 David Chu
 Apu Jan
 Michelle Liu
 Jolin Tsai
 Wang Chen Tsai-Hsia

Tanzania

 Mustafa Hassanali
 Ally Rehmtullah

Thailand

 Polpat Asavaprapha
 Busardi Muntarbhorn
 Tuck Muntarbhorn
 Sirivannavari Nariratana
 Thai Nguyen
 Thakoon Panichgul
 Pimdao Sukhahuta

Togo

 Donaldson Sackey

Trinidad and Tobago

 Anya Ayoung-Chee

Tunisia

 Azzedine Alaïa
 Max Azria

Turkey

 Yasemin Akat
 Bora Aksu
 Hanife Çetiner
 Ece Ege
 Dilara Fındıkoğlu
 Cem Hakko
 Cemil İpekçi
 Atıl Kutoğlu
 Rifat Ozbek
 Barbaros Şansal
 Ece Sükan
 Nur Yerlitaş

Uganda

 Titus Brian Ahumuza
 Santa Anzo
 Stella Atal
 Anita Beryl
 Abbas Kaijuka
 Housen Mushema
 Suzan Mutesi
 Sylvia Owori
 Rubanda-Mayonza

Ukraine

 Maryna Asauliuk
 Lubov Azria
 Irina Belotelkin
 Victoria Gres
 Vita Kin
 Anna Kolomoiets
 Ekaterina Kukhareva
 Nadia Meiher
 Sonya Monina
 Serhii and Oleg Petrov
 Yuliya Polishchuk
 Tetyana Ramus
 Vladymyr Podolyan
 Mikhail Voronin
 Natasha Zinko

United Arab Emirates

 Tamara Al-Gabbani
 Rahil Hesan
 Khalid bin Sultan Al Qasimi
 Mona al Mansouri

United Kingdom

England

A-C

 Walé Adeyemi
 Alex da Kid
 Charlie Allen
 Hardy Amies
 Alexander Amosu
 Jonathan Anderson
 Murray Arbeid
 Gary Aspden
 Jacques Azagury
 Christopher Bailey
 Jon Baker
 Maureen Baker
 William Baker
 Sheridan Barnett
 Neil Barrett
 Luella Bartley
 John Bates
 Victoria Beckham
 Ruqsana Begum
 Mary Ann Bell
 Beatrice Bellini
 Linda Bennett
 Judy Bentinck
 Antonio Berardi
 Sara Berman
 Mary Bettans
 Celia Birtwell
 Ozwald Boateng
 David Bond
 Lauren Bowker
 Moya Bowler
 Carlo Brandelli
 Christopher Brooke
 Felicity Brown
 Sheilagh Brown
 Thomas Burberry
 Sarah Burton
 Serena Bute
 Kiki Byrne
 Nigel Cabourn
 Antonia Campbell-Hughes
 Nichole de Carle
 Jane Carr
 Robert Cary-Williams
 Charlie Casely-Hayford
 Joe Casely-Hayford
 Caroline Castigliano
 Richard Cawley
 Elspeth Champcommunal
 Georgina Chapman
 Caroline Charles
 Sandra Choi
 Alexa Chung
 Lindka Cierach
 Julia Clancey
 Ossie Clark
 Gordon Luke Clarke
 Catherine Clavering
 Suzanne Clements
 Sue Clowes
 Jasper Conran
 Susannah Constantine
 Maximillion Cooper
 Paul Compitus
 Joseph Corré
 Cher Coulter
 Carolyn Cowan
 Charles Creed
 Scott Crolla
 Neisha Crosland

D-I

 Wendy Dagworthy
 Helen David
 George Davies
 Kyle De'Volle
 Giles Deacon
 Deborah & Clare
 Cara Delevingne
 Valerie Desmore
 Simon Doonan
 Lou Dalton
 Eddy Downpatrick
 Keanan Duffty
 Petra Ecclestone
 Victor Edelstein
 Warren Edwards
 Gail Elliott
 Elizabeth Emanuel
 Phoebe English
 Matilda Etches
 Chris Eubank
 Clive Evans
 Maxime de la Falaise
 Loulou de la Falaise
 Amal Fashanu
 Afshin Feiz
 Gifi Fields
 Michael Fish
 John Flett
 Marion Foale
 Tan France
 Graham Fraser
 Gina Fratini
 Frederick Freed
 Bella Freud
 Andrea Galer
 John Galliano
 Kimberley Garner
 Bay Garnett
 Elspeth Gibson
 Tom Gilbey
 Darla Jane Gilroy
 Molly Goddard
 Georgina Godley
 Robert Godley
 Peter Golding
 Oliver Goldsmith
 Paul Gorman
 Maria Grachvogel
 Craig Green
 Andrew Groves
 Herta Groves
 Lulu Guinness
 Jeremy Hackett
 Malcolm Hall
 Olivia von Halle
 Katharine Hamnett
 Elizabeth Handley-Seymour
 Georgia Hardinge
 Norman Hartnell
 Ade Hassan
 Terry de Havilland
 Doug Hayward
 Wayne Hemingway
 Scott Henshall
 Jayne Hepsibah
 Katie Hillier
 Bobby Hillson
 Anya Hindmarch
 Jennifer Hocking
 David Holah
 James Holder
 Henry Holland
 Jade Holland Cooper
 Simon Holloway
 Emma Hope
 Aisleyne Horgan-Wallace
 Judy Hornby
 Margaret Howell
 Sophie Hulme
 John Michael Ingram
 Janey Ironside

J-O

 Betty Jackson
 Charles James
 Richard James
 James Jebbia
 Richard Jewels
 Kim Jones
 Stephen Jones
 Zoe Jordan
 Mary Katrantzou
 Clare Waight Keller
 Angela Kelly
 Sara Kelly
 Lulu Kennedy
 Kate Ker-Lane
 Cath Kidston
 Nicholas Kirkwood
 Sophia Kokosalaki
 Ann Margaret Lanchester
 Ricki Noel Lander
 Karolina Laskowska
 Derek Lawlor
 Kate Lechmere
 Daniel Lee
 Supriya Lele
 Tanya Ling
 Dua Lipa
 Ben de Lisi
 Daniel Lismore
 Angus Lloyd
 Pearl Lowe
 Otto Lucas
 Lucile
 Rupert Lycett Green
 M.I.A (Maya Arulpragasam)
 Gerald McCann
 Stella McCartney
 Christopher McDonnell
 Flora McLean
 Alexander McQueen
 Claire Malcolm
 Edward Mann
 Hannah Marshall
 Giuseppe Gustavo 'Jo' Mattli
 Nasir Mazhar
 Edward Meadham
 Tamara Mellon
 Nadine Merabi
 Douglas Millings
 Deborah Milner
 Johnny Moke
 Edward Molyneux
 Marvin Morgan
 Bianca Mosca
 Kate Moss
 Catherine Murray di Montezemolo
 Carri Munden
 Trevor Myles
 Christopher Nemeth
 Ada Nettleship
 Stella Mary Newton
 Richard Nicoll
 Richard Nott
 Sonja Nuttall
 Bruce Oldfield
 Charlotte Olympia
 Beatrix Ong
 Kelly Osbourne

P-S

 Jenny Packham
 Stewart Parvin
 Melissa Percy
 Gladys Emma Peto
 Arabella Pollen
 Alice Pollock
 Thea Porter
 Mark Powell
 Nigel Preston
 Antony Price
 Harvey Proctor
 Gareth Pugh
 Mary Quant
 Richard Quinn
 Christopher Raeburn
 Michael Rainey
 Edward Rayne
 Catherine Rayner
 John Redfern
 John Reed-Crawford
 Janet Reger
 Kate Reily
 Bernard Rhodes
 Zandra Rhodes
 John Richmond
 Bunny Roger
 Jeffrey Rogers
 Edina Ronay
 Charlotte Ronson
 Martine Rose
 Peter Russell
 Philip Sallon
 Samata
 David Sassoon
 Janie Schaffer
 Christopher Shannon
 Michael Sherard
 David Shilling
 Tabitha Simmons
 Graham Smith
 Justin Smith
 Nick Smith
 Paul Smith
 Richard Smith
 Philip Somerville
 Simon Spurr
 Claire Stansfield
 Tomasz Starzewski
 Victor Stiebel
 Stevie Stewart
 Stuart Stockdale
 Joanne Stoker
 Helen Storey
 Henri Strzelecki
 Ian Stuart
 Petra Stunt
 Dan Sullivan
 Paul Surridge
 John Sutcliffe
 Oliver Sykes

T-Z

 Lucy Tammam
 Alice Temperley
 William Tempest
 Karl Templer
 Ian Thomas
 Teddy Tinling
 Karen Townshend
 Dolly Tree
 Rachel Trevor-Morgan
 Sally Tuffin
 Twiggy
 Patricia Underwood
 Julie Verhoeven
 Stuart Vevers
 Diana Vickers
 Grace Wales Bonner
 Catherine Walker
 Magnus Walker
 Amanda Wakeley
 Marie Wallin
 Tilly Walnes
 Gok Wan
 Sophia Webster
 James Wedge
 Hannah Weiland
 Peter Werth
 Kim West
 Vivienne Westwood
 Ashley Williams
 Stephen Williams
 Matthew Williamson
 Louise Wilson
 Trinny Woodall
 Aida Woolf
 Charles Frederick Worth
 Rhoda Wyburn
 Esme Young
 Ada Zanditon

Scotland

 John Boyd
 Serena Bute
 William Chambers
 Philip Colbert
 Holly Fulton
 Bill Gibb
 Patrick Grant
 Charles Jeffrey
 Pam Hogg
 Christopher Kane
 Michelle Mone
 Jean Muir
 Eunice Olumide
 Ronald Paterson
 Ray Petri
 Jonathan Saunders
 John Stephen
 Douglas Stuart
 Stuart Trevor

Wales

 Laura Ashley
 Jeff Banks
 Mark Eley
 David Emanuel
 Timothy Everest
 Kate Lambert
 Julien Macdonald
 Nina Morgan-Jones
 Tommy Nutter
 Jayne Pierson

United States

0-A

 50 Cent
 Robert Abajian
 Osceola Macarthy Adams
 Adolfo
 Adri
 Adrian
 Joseph Abboud
 Virgil Abloh
 Paul Abrahamian
 Ray Aghayan
 Yoon Ahn
 Jackie Aina
 Lanie Alabanza-Barcena
 Steven Alan
 Larry Aldrich
 Lois K. Alexander Lane
 Jason Alkire
 June Ambrose
 Cindy Ambuehl
 Marcus Amerman
 Mike Amiri
 Kaylin Andres
 Paul Andrew
 Spencer Antle
 Loren Aragon
 Asspizza
 Lorencita Atencio
 Bill Atkinson
 Brian Atwood
 Pegah Anvarian
 Kevin Aviance
 Jacqueline Ayer

B

 Mark Badgley
 Xenobia Bailey
 Louella Ballerino
 Jeffrey Banks
 Travis Banton
 A$AP Bari
 Jhane Barnes
 Robin Barnes
 Tuesday Bassen
 Michael Bastian
 Suede Baum
 Kathrine Baumann
 Jen Beeman
 Geoffrey Beene
 Bill Belew
 Hunter Bell
 Salehe Bembury
 Zaida Ben-Yusuf
 Henri Willis Bendel
 Stacey Bendet
 Fira Benenson
 Laura Bennett
 Susan Bennis
 Fonzworth Bentley
 Chris Benz
 Robyn Berkley
 JoAnn Berman
 Danielle Bernstein
 Drew Bernstein
 James Pasqual Bettio
 Jonas Bevacqua
 Christopher Bevans
 Beyoncé
 Jeanne Bice
 Ashley Biden
 Stanley Blacker
 Hazel Rodney Blackman
 Richard Blackwell
 Bob Bland
 Bill Blass
 Mildred Blount
 Stevie Boi
 Krayzie Bone
 Ann Bonfoey Taylor
 Waraire Boswell
 Tony Bowls
 Barbara Bradley Baekgaard
 Rosemary Brantley
 Tom Brigance
 Dianne Brill
 Helen Brockman
 Bonnie Broel
 Gessica Brooke
 Donald Brooks
 Thom Browne
 Sabrina Bryan
 Dana Buchman
 Sophie Buhai
 Georgia Bullock Lloyd
 Tory Burch
 Kenny Burns
 Stephen Burrows
 Jon Buscemi
 Lauren Bush
 Ebenezer Butterick
 Austin Butts
 Amanda Bynes

C

 Don C
 Jean Cacicedo
 Lillian Cahn
 Miles Cahn
 Joan Calabrese
 Sarah Calhoun
 Eva Camacho-Sánchez
 Jeanne S. Campbell
 Carlos Campos
 Vince Camuto
 Joselyn Cano
 Ruth Sacks Caplin
 Albert Capraro
 Alex Carleton
 Jack Carlson
 Hattie Carnegie
 Elizabeth Carpenter
 Kelly Carrington
 Bonnie Cashin
 Cecilia Cassini
 Oleg Cassini
 Kristin Cavallari
 Sal Cesarani
 Richard Chai
 Julie Chaiken
 Angela Chan
 Angel Chang
 Alabama Chanin
 Kip Chapelle
 Ceil Chapman
 Juli Lynne Charlot
 Arielle Charnas
 Willy Chavarria
 Monika Chiang
 Margaret Cho
 Andrew Christian
 Matthew Christopher
 Doo-Ri Chung
 Susan Cianciolo
 Liz Claiborne
 Claw Money
 Telfar Clemens
 James Clifford
 Susie Coelho
 Nudie Cohn
 Kenneth Cole
 Liz Collins
 Sean Combs
 Dennis Comeau
 Rachel Comey
 Cristi Conaway
 Lauren Conrad
 Mandy Coon
 Jo Copeland
 Calleen Cordero
 Dorian Corey
 Victor Costa
 Michael Costello
 Jeffrey Costello
 Fannie Criss
 Caresse Crosby
 Kein Cross
 Candice Cuoco

D-F

 Caroline D'Amore
 Lilly Daché
 Laura Dahl
 Phoebe Dahl
 Eric Daman
 Chloe Dao
 Betty David
 Karl Davis
 Rob Davis
 Vicky Davis
 Daniel Day
 Marisol Deluna
 Ellen Louise Demorest
 Jane Derby
 Lyn Devon
 Diana Dew
 Scott Disick
 Kristen Doute
 Rehn Dudukgian
 Haylie Duff
 Hilary Duff
 Charlie Dunn
 Alison Eastwood
 Mike Eckhaus
 Marc Ecko
 Alan Eckstein
 Melody Ehsani
 Florence Eiseman
 Lauren Elaine
 Perry Ellis
 Ella Emhoff
 Diana Eng
 Kataluna Enriquez
 Bonnie Erickson
 Patrik Ervell
 George Esquivel
 Luis Estevez
 Charles Evans
 Lou Eyrich
 Baron Von Fancy
 Beatrice Farnham
 Kaffe Fassett
 Natalia Fedner
 Beverly Feldman
 Randy Fenoli
 Douglas Ferguson
 Abi Ferrin
 Erin Fetherston
 Andrew Fezza
 Lupe Fiasco
 Patricia Field
 Phyllis Fife
 Jimmie Carole Fife Stewart
 Sandy Fife Wilson
 Ron Finley
 Renée Firestone
 Eileen Fisher
 Edith Flagg
 Alan Flusser
 Anne Fogarty
 Edith Foltz
 Cliff Fong
 Mia Fonssagrives-Solow
 Tom Ford
 Roger Forsythe
 Daniel Franco
 Paul Frank
 Diane von Fürstenberg
 Talita von Fürstenberg

G-H

 James Galanos
 Katie Gallagher
 Jeff Garner
 Eric Gaskins
 Kaia Gerber
 Natali Germanotta
 Rudi Gernreich
 August Getty
 Nats Getty
 Mossimo Giannulli
 Kayne Gillaspie
 Diane Gilman
 Sophie Gimbel
 Jared Gold
 Kimberly Goldson
 Lori Goldstein
 Selena Gomez
 Wes Gordon
 Jenny Gordy
 Gary Graham
 Gogo Graham
 Dorothy Grant
 Sandra Gray
 Howard Greer
 Henry Grethel
 Odessa Warren Grey
 Lynda Grose
 Shoshanna Lonstein Gruss
 Sergio Guadarrama
 Mondo Guerra
 Prabal Gurung
 Julia Haart
 Cassidy Haley
 Kevan Hall
 George Halley
 Halston
 Peggy Hamilton
 Tim Hamilton
 Mary Alice Haney
 Antthony Mark Hankins
 Susie Schmitt Hanson
 Donwan Harrell
 Marcy Harriell
 Lorene Harrison
 Johnson Hartig
 Tinker Hatfield
 Christina Hattler
 Julie Haus
 Elizabeth Hawes
 Jesse Hawley
 Christina Hattler
 Batsheva Hay
 Edith Head
 Oliver Helden
 Seth Aaron Henderson
 Kimberly Hendrix
 Eta Hentz
 Gregory Herman
 Stan Herman
 Mila Hermanovski
 Lazaro Hernandez
 Tommy Hilfiger
 Anne T. Hill
 Sherri Hill
 Nicky Hilton Rothschild
 Lena Himmelstein
 Susan Holmes
 Joe Allen Hong
 Jacob H. Horwitz
 Ola Hudson
 Keith Hufnagel
 Merry Hull
 Misa Hylton

I-K

 Stacy Igel
 Jenn Im
 Indashio
 Irene (Irene Lentz)
 Connor Ives
 Dee and Ricky Jackson
 Janet Jackson
 Marc Jacobs
 Eli James
 Sidney Janis
 Kerby Jean-Raymond
 jeffstaple
 Kendall Jenner
 Kylie Jenner
 Jermikko
 Elisa Jimenez
 Daymond John
 John P. John (Mr John)
 Kevin Johnn
 Coco Johnsen
 Betsey Johnson
 Teri Jon
 Gretchen Jones
 Kidada Jones
 Lauren Jones
 Victor Joris
 Margaret Josephs
 Christian Joy
 Alexander Julian
 Jessica Jung
 Nik Kacy
 Bill Kaiserman
 Robert Kalloch
 Norma Kamali
 Karen Kane
 Karl Kani
 Jen Kao
 Emily Kappes
 Edmund Kara
 Donna Karan
 Kim Kardashian
 Khloé Kardashian
 Kourtney Kardashian
 Herbert Kasper
 Ali Kay
 Elizabeth Keckley
 Rod Keenan
 Clinton Kelly
 Patrick Kelly
 Kathy Kemp
 Dorit Kemsley
 Omar Kiam
 Christina Kim
 Elaine Kim
 Eugenia Kim
 Alan King
 Ben King
 Muriel King
 Joy Kingston
 Alexis Kirk
 Katiti Kironde
 Audrey Kitching
 Charles Kleibacker
 Anne Klein
 Calvin Klein
 John Kloss
 Mychael Knight
 Eric de Kolb
 Jonathan Koon
 Solange Knowles
 Tina Knowles
 Ronny Kobo
 Michael Kors
 Reed Krakoff
 Carson Kressley
 Michael Kuluva

L

 Pepper LaBeija
 Michelle Laine
 Derek Lam
 Brianna Lance
 Kenneth Jay Lane
 Liz Lange
 Kara Laricks
 Raun Larose
 Byron Lars
 Zoe Latta
 Ralph Lauren
 Nicole M. LeBlanc
 Heidi Lee
 Helen Lee
 Suzanne Lee
 Larry LeGaspi
 Judith Leiber
 Humberto Leon
 Nanette Lepore
 Tina Leser
 Maurice Levin
 Asher Levine
 Beth Levine
 Larry Levine
 Matt Levine
 Monica Lewinsky
 Monah Li
 Brian Lichtenberg
 Andrea Lieberman
 Lil Debbie
 Carol Lim
 Phillip Lim
 Adam Lippes
 Col. Littleton
 Yohanna Logan
 Gene London
 Don Loper
 Jennifer Lopez
 Oscar G. Lopez
 Jerry Lorenzo
 Bobby Love
 Ron LoVece
 Ann Lowe
 Chloe Lukasiak
 Parke Lutter
 Jenna Lyons

M

 Jack Mackenroth
 Bob Mackie
 Steve Madden
 Leigh Magar
 Edith Mahier
 Mainbocher (Main Bocher)
 Loza Maléombho
 John Malkovich
 Adrienne Maloof
 Taryn Manning
 Margaret Manny
 Rooney Mara
 Mary Jane Marcasiano
 Chris March
 Marjorie Bear Don't Walk
 Lana Marks
 Luba Marks
 Paul Marlow
 Deborah Marquit
 Leanne Marshall
 Kelli Martin
 Sid Mashburn
 Manny Mashouf
 Saul Maslavi
 Brandon Maxwell
 Vera Maxwell
 Claire McCardell
 Jay McCarroll
 Shon McCarthy
 Becca McCharen-Tran
 Jessica McClintock
 Jack McCollough
 LisaRaye McCoy
 Reyn McCullough
 Bradon McDonald
 Mary McFadden
 Arthur McGee
 Hogan McLaughlin
 Mark McNairy
 Leah McSweeney
 Nancy Melcher
 Raul Melgoza
 Rosie Mercado
 Ashton Michael
 Keith Michael
 Draya Michele
 Michael Michele
 David Meister
 Kaila Methven
 Emily Miles
 Sally Milgrim
 Annie Jenness Miller
 Nicole Miller
 Nolan Miller
 Romeo Miller
 Rosemary Reed Miller
 Savannah Miller
 Sienna Miller
 James Mischka
 Isaac Mizrahi
 Bibhu Mohapatra
 Germaine Monteil
 Marjorie Montgomery
 Heidi Montag
 Vincent Monte-Sano
 Diego Montoya
 Ardina Moore
 Mandy Moore
 Mark Mooring
 Sonja Morgan
 Leslie Morris
 Rose Mortem
 Minnie Mortimer
 Tinsley Mortimer
 Rebecca Moses
 Lauren Moshi
 Tereneh Mosley
 Bethany Mota
 Mario Moya
 Ibtihaj Muhammad
 Peter Mui
 Kate and Laura Mulleavy
 Malini Murjani
 Anthony Muto
 Paige Mycoskie
 Josephine Myers-Wapp
 Morton Myles

N-Q

 Nas
 Gela Nash-Taylor
 Josie Natori
 Tracy Negoshian
 Lloyd Kiva New
 Bernard Newman
 Albert Nipon
 Vanessa Noel
 Ralph Lauren
 Charles Nolan
 Peggy Noland
 Misha Nonoo
 Norman Norell
 Maggie Norris
 Ryan Jude Novelline
 Bobbie Nudie
 Aubrey O'Day
 Melissa Odabash
 Dee Ocleppo
 Jamie Okuma
 Todd Oldham
 Shayne Oliver
 Ashley Olsen
 Mary-Kate Olsen
 Orry-Kelly
 Virgil Ortiz
 Mel Ottenberg
 Jennifer Ouellette
 Kimberly Ovitz
 Rick Owens
 Marialia Pacitto
 Olivia Palermo
 Gladys Parker
 Molly Parnis
 Russell Patterson
 DJ Paul
 Laura Pearson
 Sylvia Pedlar
 Maya Penn
 Wendy Pepper
 Claire Pettibone
 Amanda Phelan
 Elizabeth Phelps
 Mary Phelps Jacob
 Sarah Phillips
 Henriette Simon Picker
 Pictureplane
 Mary Ping
 Maria Pinto
 Babette Pinsky
 Andrea Pitter
 Mimi Plange
 Cecile Platovsky
 Wendy Ponca
 Lawren Pope
 Whitney Port
 Zac Posen
 Clare Potter
 Heron Preston
 Cristiana Proietti
 Prudence
 J. Morgan Puett
 Lilly Pulitzer

R

 Max Raab
 Tala Raassi
 Randi Rahm
 Traver Rains
 Natacha Rambova
 David Rappaport
 Rasheeda
 Emily Grace Reaves
 Harris Reed
 Nell Donnelly Reed
 Wendi Reed
 Tracy Reese
 Billy Reid
 Rose Marie Reid
 Ben Reig
 Oscar de la Renta
 Edith Reuss
 Jessica Rey
 Donna Ricco
 Santino Rice
 Jessica Rich
 Richie Rich
 Lisa Rinna
 Larry Roberts Salters
 Bill Robinson
 Craig Robinson
 Patrick Robinson
 Narciso Rodriguez
 Ariana Rockefeller
 Carolyne Roehm
 Ciera Rogers
 Ruth Rogers-Altmann
 Alice Roi
 Pamella Roland
 William Rondina
 Helen Rose
 Lela Rose
 Daniel Roseberry
 Eva Rosencrans
 Steven Rosengard
 Nettie Rosenstein
 Christian Francis Roth
 Franklin Rowe
 Cynthia Rowley
 Rachel Roy
 Sonja Rubin
 Ralph Rucci
 Clovis Ruffin
 Mirela Rupic
 Marty Ruza

S

 Marie St John
 Hailie Sahar
 Cynthia Sakai
 Sandra Sakata
 Fernando Sánchez
 Giorgio di Sant' Angelo
 Carolina Santo Domingo
 Behnaz Sarafpour
 Ferdinando Sarmi
 Kara Saun
 Michele Savino
 Austin Scarlett
 Werner G. Scharff
 Mindy Scheier
 Nicole Scherzinger
 Michael Schmidt
 Carolyn Schnurer
 Caroline Zoe Schumm
 Jeremy Scott
 L'Wren Scott
 Veronica Scott
 Jeffrey Sebelia
 Selena
 Wray Serna
 Chloë Sevigny
 Ronaldus Shamask
 Geraldine M. Sherman
 Eileen Shields
 Jasmin Shokrian
 Darcey Silva
 Dexter Simmons
 Diggy Simmons
 Kimora Lee Simmons
 Russell Simmons
 Fabrice Simon
 Adele Simpson
 Jessica Simpson
 Rubin Singer
 Christian Siriano
 Nikki Sixx
 Elena Slivnyak
 Bill Smith
 LaQuan Smith
 Michelle Smith
 Willi Smith
 Todd Snyder
 Mimi So
 Peter Som
 Aimee Song
 Luke Song
 Andre Soriano
 Emilio Sosa
 Soulja Boy
 Kate Spade
 Peter Speliopoulos
 Robert L. Spencer
 Mary Lou Spiess
 Ruth Spooner
 Stephen Sprouse
 Jeffree Star
 George Stavropoulos
 Frances Stein
 Gwen Stefani
 Scott Steinberg
 Francesca Sterlacci
 Josie Stevens
 Ellen Stewart
 Johan Ludwig Stifel
 Steven Stolman
 Kate Stoltz
 Elena Stonaker
 Christopher Straub
 Jill Stuart
 Shawn Stussy
 Tara Subkoff
 Anna Sui
 Ivy Supersonic
 Charles Suppon
 Swizz Beatz

T-V

 Wesley Tann
 Isa Tapia
 Amir Taghi
 Robert Tagliapietra
 Gustave Tassell
 Tila Tequila
 Tere Tereba
 Thea Tewi
 Barbara Tfank
 Ouigi Theodore
 threeasfour
 Stephanie Thomas
 Todd Thomas
 Azalea Thorpe
 Vicky Tiel
 Monika Tilley
 Susie Tompkins Buell
 Robert Tonner
 Marina Toybina
 Pauline Trigère
 Van Day Truex
 Ivanka Trump
 Elaine Turner
 Jessie Franklin Turner
 Maurice Tumarkin
 David Tutera
 Tyler, The Creator
 Kay Unger
 Zelda Wynn Valdes
 Valentina
 Alvin Valley
 Carmen Marc Valvo
 Theadora Van Runkle
 Gloria Vanderbilt
 John Varvatos
 Joan Vass
 Elena Velez
 Mike Vensel
 Gia Ventola
 Louis Verdad
 Nick Verreos
 Sally Victor
 Miranda Vidak
 Adrienne Vittadini
 Clare Vivier
 Michaele Vollbracht
 Voris
 Daniel Vosovic

W-Z

 Alexander Wang
 Vera Wang
 Jahleel Weaver
 Jimmy Webb
 Marissa Webb
 Clayton and Flavie Webster
 Timo Weiland
 Chester Weinberg
 Heidi Weisel
 John Weitz
 Stuart Weitzman
 Clare West
 Kanye West
 Stephen West
 Vera West
 Margaret Roach Wheeler
 Delina White
 Carol Hannah Whitfield
 Jazmin Whitley
 Bill Frank Whitten
 Emily Wilkens
 Jeffrey Williams
 Matthew Williams
 Pharrell Williams
 Vanessa Williams
 Kevin Willis
 Eva Danielle Wittels
 Sherry Wolf
 Kaisik Wong
 Sue Wong
 Margaret Wood
 Nick Wooster
 Sydney Wragge
 Jaime Xie
 Luly Yang
 Bethany Yellowtail
 Yeohlee
 Molly Yestadt
 Sean Yseult
 Jean Yu
 Jay Z
 Zaldy
 Karen Zambos
 Zane One
 Diva Zappa
 Zarah
 Paul Zastupnevich
 Rachel Zoe
 Zoran
 Mark Zunino

Uruguay

 Gabriela Hearst

Venezuela

 Nicolas Felizola
 Carolina Herrera
 Ángel Sánchez

Vietnam

 Thuy Diep
 Tôn Hiếu Anh
 Đặng Thị Minh Hạnh

Zaire

 Odette Krempin
 Adama Ndiaye

Zimbabwe

 Liam Fahy

See also

 List of jewellery designers

 
Lists of people by occupation
Design-related lists
History of fashion
Fashion occupations
Fashion-related lists